Florinda Andreucci (born 19 December 1969) is a former Italian long-distance runner who competed at individual senior level at the IAAF World Half Marathon Championships.

She is the twin sister of Lucilla Andreucci, who is also a long-distance runner.

References

External links
 

1969 births
Living people
Italian female long-distance runners
Athletes from Rome